Tiki is the first man in Māori mythology or a humanoid carving in Central Eastern Polynesian culture generally.

Tiki may also refer to:

People
 Tiki (name), list of people with the name

Computing
Tiki Data, a Norwegian computer company
Tiki 100, a desktop home/personal computer
Tiki Wiki CMS Groupware

Arts and entertainment
 Tiki (album), a 2005 album by Richard Bona
 Tiki, the protagonist from Japanese arcade game The New Zealand Story
 Tiki III, the schooner in the American television series Adventures in Paradise
 Tiki, a divine dragon character in the Fire Emblem video game series
 Tiki (Symphogear), a character in the anime series Symphogear

Other uses
Hei-tiki, a type of Māori neck pendant
Tiki (gecko), a reptile commonly found clinging to walls in the Philippines
Tiki culture, a decoration style for bars, restaurants and clubs loosely based on Polynesian motifs
Tiki bar
Tiki Formation, a Mesozoic geologic formation
Brockville Tikis, a Canadian junior ice hockey team
Tiki, a kit car

See also
"El Tiki", a 2015 song by Colombian reggaeton artist Maluma
Teke (disambiguation)
Tiky, a soft drink in Guatemala

Lists of people by nickname